Benito Contreras (16 May 1905 – July 1972) was a Mexican footballer. He competed in the men's tournament at the 1928 Summer Olympics.

References

External links
 
 

1905 births
1972 deaths
Mexican footballers
Mexico international footballers
Olympic footballers of Mexico
Footballers at the 1928 Summer Olympics
Place of birth missing
Association football midfielders
Club América footballers